Shank may refer to:

Objects 
 Shank (footwear), part of a shoe or boot
 Shank (sewing), a spacing device
 Shank (weapon), a makeshift knife or stabbing weapon
 Lead shank, a type of lead used for horses
 Tang (tools), the back portion of the blade component of a tool
 Drill bit shank, the end of a drill bit
 Sheepshank, a knot used to shorten a rope

Art and entertainment 
 Shank (video game), an action game
 Shank (2009 film), a British drama
 Shank (2010 film), a thriller set in futuristic London
 Shank, a play by Richard Vincent
 Warlord Shank, a villain in the TV series Space Cases
SHANK, a Japanese Punk Rock band.

Places
 Mount Schank, a dormant volcano in Australia
 Shankh Monastery, a monastery in Mongolia
 Shanksville, Pennsylvania

Other uses 
 Another name for the lower leg in humans
 Tibia, one of the two main bones of the leg
 Shank (meat), a cut of meat (e.g., beef shank)
 Shank, a poor golf stroke
 Shanks, wading birds in the genus Tringa
 Sheepshank, a knot used to shorten a rope
 Shankh, a quantity in the Indian numbering system
 SHANK1, SHANK2, and SHANK3, types of protein

People with the name
 Bud Shank, an American saxophonist
 Christopher B. Shank, Maryland politician
 Daniel Shank, a Canadian ice hockey player
 Harvey Shank, Canadian baseball player
 John Shank, a 17th-century English actor
 David E. Shank, co-founder and long-time General Manager of the co-op that developed Shenandoah's Pride milk brand
 Charles V. Shank, physicist, inventor of femtosecond lasers

See also
 Schenck
 Schenk
 Shenk
 Shanks (disambiguation)